The tamak'  is a stick-struck double-headed drum of the Santal people of India. The body of the drum is made from metal and shaped like a large bowl. The head of the drum is usually cowhide and 14-18 inches in diameter. The player strikes the drum with a pair of drum sticks. The Santal believe that the tamak' has special religious powers and it is often used for religious ceremonies and Santal festivals. The rhythm of the tamak' often sets the basic metric/rhythmic pattern for Santal dances and is an essential instrument for traditional  Santal music.

See also 
 Music of India

Directly struck membranophones
Indian musical instruments
Drums